The Battle of Llanos de Santa Juana was a battle of the War of Mexican Independence that occurred on 12 July 1811 in the area around Cuauhtémoc, Colima known as Llanos de Santa Juana. The battle was fought between the royalist forces loyal to the Spanish crown and the Mexican rebels fighting for independence from the Spanish Empire. The Mexican insurgents were commanded by General José Calixto Martínez y Moreno and the Spanish by Colonel Manuel del Río. The battle resulted in a victory for the Spanish royalists.

The battle 
The insurgents, commanded by General José Calixto Martínez y Moreno (also known as Cadenas), were routed by the royalist forces of Manuel del Rio. The rebel forces suffered 300 soldiers killed out of 1,000, the majority of these being local villagers who were armed, but not generally trained to fight.

Aftermath 
Almost immediately following this defeat, however, on 16 July 1811, the rebel forces operating in Colima, under the command of Ignacio Sandoval and Miguel Gallaga, were able to seize the state for the rebel cause, making the loss at Llanos de Santa Juana of less tactical importance.

See also 
 Mexican War of Independence

References 
 The information on this page has been translated from its Spanish equivalent.

Bibliography 

Llanos de Santa Juana
Llanos de Santa Juana
History of Colima
Llanos de Santa Juana
Llanos de Santa Juana
1811 in New Spain
July 1811 events